Learchis evelinae is a species of sea slug, specifically an aeolid nudibranch. It is a marine gastropod mollusc in the family Facelinidae.

Distribution
This species was described from 1 m depth on the reef-flat outside the Bellairs Research Institute, Barbados. It has been reported from Florida.

References

Facelinidae
Gastropods described in 1983